Miguel Gerardo Velázquez Olivares (born 2 July 1990) is a Mexican professional footballer who plays as a right-back for Atlético Morelia.

Honours
Morelia
Liga de Expansión MX: Clausura 2022

External links

References

Living people
1990 births
People from Tlalnepantla de Baz
Footballers from the State of Mexico
Association football fullbacks
Atlético Morelia players
C.F. Pachuca players
Tecos F.C. footballers
Altamira F.C. players
Mineros de Zacatecas players
Club León footballers
Liga MX players
Ascenso MX players
Liga Premier de México players
Tercera División de México players
Mexican footballers